Marta Dynel is a Polish linguist and professor at Łódź University, Poland. She is known for her works on pragmatics
and is the editor-in-chief of the journal Lingua.

Career
Marta Dynel received her PhD (2006) from Łódź University, followed by habilitation (dr Litt.) in 2012 and a full professor degree in 2022. She is affiliated with the University of Łódź and Vilnius Gediminas Technical University, holding two research fellow positions. Since the beginning of her academic career, she has studied humour, irony, impoliteness and deception from both theoretical and empirical angles, based on film discourse and social media data.

Books
 Irony, Deception and Humour: Seeking the Truth about Overt and Covert Untruthfulness. Mouton Series in Pragmatics. Mouton de Gruyter. 2018
 Humorous Garden-Paths: A Pragmatic-Cognitive Study. Newcastle: Cambridge Scholars Publishing. 2009

References

External links
 Marta Dynel

Pragmaticists
Living people
Year of birth missing (living people)
Linguists from Poland
University of Łódź alumni
Academic staff of the University of Łódź
Linguistics journal editors
Women linguists
Academic staff of Vilnius Gediminas Technical University
Irony theorists
Humor researchers
Discourse analysts